Remix Plus is an EP of remixed hits by Greek singer Katy Garbi. It was released in Greece and Cyprus by Sony Music Greece in May 2002.

Background
The EP includes the album version of "Thelo Apopse Na Horepso" . At the time of the EPs release, the track was being promoted and released as the third single of Apla Ta Pragmata, and so in a crossover promotion "Thelo Apopse Na Horepso" was included as the fourth track.

Track listing
 "Krayon" (Remix) (Κραγιόν; Lipstick) – 4:03
 "Otan Se Hreiazomai" (Remix) (Όταν σε χρειάζομαι; When I need you) – 4:22
 "Apla Ta Pragmata" (Remix) (Απλά τα πράγματα; Things are simple) – 4:05
 "Thelo Apopse Na Horepso" (Θέλω απόψε να χορεψω; I want to dance tonight) – 3:29
 "Krayon" (Extended Version) (Κραγιόν; Lipstick) – 6:22

Singles
"Thelo Apopse Na Horepso"
"Thelo Apopse Na Horepso", composed by Dimitris Zemkos, was the precursor to the remix EP, and also the third single of the album Apla Ta Pragmata.

"Kragion (Remix)"
The short version remix of the track "Kragion" was used to promote the EPs release in early 2003.

Chart performance

Note: EPs charted as CD Singles in Greece.

Greek-language albums
Katy Garbi EPs
Katy Garbi remix albums
2002 EPs
2002 remix albums
Remix EPs
Sony Music Greece remix albums
Sony Music Greece EPs
Columbia Records remix albums
Columbia Records EPs